Ologamasiphis is a genus of mites in the family Parasitidae.

Species
 Ologamasiphis disfistulatus (Athias Henriot, 1967)     
 Ologamasiphis minimus Holzmann, 1969

References

Parasitidae